The Women's omnium was one of the 5 women's cycling events at the 2010 European Track Championships, held in Pruszków, Poland.

20 cyclists participated in the contest, held on November 6.

Flying Lap

Points race 20 km

Elimination race

Individual Pursuit 3 km

Scratch race 10 km

500 m time trial

Final Classification

References

Flying Lap Results
Points Race Results
Elimination Race Results
Individual Pursuit Results
Scratch Race Results
Time Trial Results
Final Classification

Women's omnium
European Track Championships – Women's omnium